Thomas Ouwejan (born 30 September 1996) is a Dutch professional footballer who plays as a left-back for Bundesliga club Schalke 04.

Career

AZ
Ouwejan joined the AZ youth academy from childhood club De Foresters in 2007. On 10 December 2015, he made his first appearance for the club, starting in a UEFA Europa League match against Athletic Bilbao. He was replaced in the 75th minute for Pantelis Hatzidiakos, another debuting player. Three days later, Ouwejan also made his Eredivisie debut in a game against PEC Zwolle. That season, he also came to 16 appearances and two goals for the reserve team, Jong AZ. In addition, he appeared once in the KNVB Cup and three times in the Eredivisie; with AZ finishing fourth and qualifying for the UEFA Europa League qualifying round.

The following season, he played once for the reserve team and 16 times for the first team in all competitions. In the following play-off games for participation in the Europa League preliminary round, AZ reached the final, but eventually lost to FC Utrecht on penalties.

In the 2017–18 season, Ouwejan became a regular starter and appeared in six matches in the KNVB Cup and 31 matches in the Eredivisie. AZ reached the final of the cup that year, in which they lost to Feyenoord. In the Eredivisie, AZ took third place. He continued as a starter during the 2018–19 season, scoring two goals in 31 league appearances and one goal – his first in European tournaments – in the third qualifying round of the Europa League against Ukrainian side Mariupol.

At the start of the 2019–20 season, new head coach Arne Slot preferred the newly emerged youngster Owen Wijndal at left back, which meant that Ouwejan mostly appeared as a midfielder, and found himself increasingly out of the starting lineup. He finished the season with 10 appearances in the Eredivisie and six in the Europa League.

Loan to Udinese
Ouwejan joined Italian Serie A club Udinese on a season-loan from AZ for the 2020–21 season, with an option to buy. He made his debut for the side on 27 September 2020 in a 1–0 loss to Verona.

Schalke 04
On 1 June 2021, Ouwejan agreed to join Schalke 04 on loan for the 2021–22 season with an option to make the move permanent. On 12 May 2022, Schalke exercised this option.

International career
Ouwejan gained five caps for the Netherlands under-17 team and took part with the under-19 team in the 2015 UEFA European Under-19 Championship. He was utilised in all three of Netherlands' games in the tournament, which was eliminated after the group stage. He then gained eight caps for at under-20 level, and made his debut for the Netherlands U21 team on 15 November 2016 in the 2017 UEFA European Under-17 Championship qualifier against Portugal in Doetinchem.

Career statistics

Honours
Schalke 04
2. Bundesliga: 2021–22

References

External links 
 Profile at the FC Schalke 04 website
 
 Netherlands profile at Ons Oranje

1996 births
Living people
Association football midfielders
Dutch footballers
Netherlands under-21 international footballers
Netherlands youth international footballers
Eredivisie players
Serie A players
Bundesliga players
2. Bundesliga players
AZ Alkmaar players
Jong AZ players
Udinese Calcio players
FC Schalke 04 players
Expatriate footballers in Italy
Dutch expatriate footballers
Sportspeople from Alkmaar
Dutch expatriate sportspeople in Italy
Footballers from North Holland